Howard Gilman (February 15, 1924 – January 3, 1998) was descendant of Isaac Gilman, who had founded the Gilman Paper Company in 1884.

Biography
Gilman was born and raised on Manhattan's Upper East Side. He attended Horace Mann School in the Bronx, New York, and received his bachelor's degree in 1944 from Dartmouth College, where he was elected to Phi Beta Kappa. He served in the Navy during World War II.

Gilman died in 1998 of a heart attack at age 73, at his White Oak Plantation near Jacksonville, Florida. He had $1.1 billion in assets, and $550 million of debt. As he was childless, he donated his assets to the Howard Gilman Foundation. The Brooklyn Academy of Music has the Howard Gilman Opera House. The Howard Gilman Gallery houses his extensive collection at the Metropolitan Museum of Art and the Howard Gilman Theatre is located at Lincoln Center.

References

1924 births
1998 deaths
Dartmouth College alumni
Businesspeople from New York City
20th-century American businesspeople
People from the Upper East Side
Horace Mann School alumni
Philanthropists from New York (state)
United States Navy personnel of World War II
20th-century American philanthropists